Daniel Grove (December 14, 1923September 13, 1999) was a United States Army veteran, probation counselor, public official, and state representative in Colorado. He was a Democrat.

He served as probation officer for Denver's juvenile court. The Denver Public Library has a collection of his papers.

Grove was the eighth of ten children, born to Elbert V. and Mary M. Grove. His father was a blacksmith in Millport, Alabama. His family moved to Tuscaloosa, Alabama when he was a toddler, and he studied at Tuscaloosa County Training School and the Industrial High School in Tuscaloosa before dropping out in 1940 to join the Army. He married Mary E. Hyche on November 7, 1940 at the age of 17. They had four boys.

References

1923 births
1999 deaths
Democratic Party members of the Colorado House of Representatives
Probation and parole officers
20th-century American politicians
People from Lamar County, Alabama
People from Tuscaloosa, Alabama
United States Army soldiers
Politicians from Denver